The New Adventures of Captain Wrongel ( is a 1978 Soviet children's musical adventure film directed by Gennady Vasilyev loosely based on The Adventures of Captain Wrongel by Andrei Nekrasov.

Plot
At the English lesson in the secondary school No. 12 in Gurzuf, the teacher gives children the task to write an essay titled "The Summer Holiday". Young pioneer member Vasya Lopotukhin opens the exercise book but his thoughts are far away from the lesson.

As a result, in his dreams he goes along with Captain Wrongel to investigate the mystery of the Bermuda Triangle. Thanks to ingenuity and resourcefulness, Vasya manages to unravel the machinations of a group of gangsters who are operating in the area of the Bermuda Triangle. And now Vasily Ivanovich Lopotukhin, already a well-known scientist, is preparing for new expeditions, intending to investigate the mystery of Atlantis...

Cast
Mikhail Pugovkin - Captain Wrongel
Zurab Kapianidze - Assistant to Captain Lom
Sergey Martinson - Sir Vant, bandit leader
Vladimir Basov - Block Silent
Savely Kramarov - Fierce Harry, agent-gangster
Arkady Markin - Vasya Lopotukhin
Ksenia Turchan - Katya Malakhova
Rudolf Rudin - Seraphim Nazhdak, reporter

See also
Adventures of Captain Wrongel, a 1981 film

References

External links

Soviet adventure films
1970s adventure films
1970s musical films
Soviet musical films
1970s children's adventure films
Films set in Crimea
Russian children's films
Gorky Film Studio films
Soviet children's films